Amphipoea oculea, the ear moth, is a moth of the family Noctuidae. It was first described by Carl Linnaeus in 1761 and it is found in most of the Palearctic realm.

The wingspan is 29–34 mm. Forewing pale or dark ferruginous brown; the veins brown; inner and outer lines double, brown, wide apart; the inner curved outwards between, and toothed inwards on, the veins; the outer with the inner arm thin, lunulate-dentate, the outer thick, continuous and parallel; a thick dark median shade running between the stigmata; submarginal line indistinct, waved, angled on vein 7, above which it is preceded by a dark costal patch; orbicular stigma rounded, orange, with a brown ring; reniform white, with the veins across it brown and containing on the discocellular a brown-outlined lunule, of which the centre is yellowish; the colour with brown outline; hindwing fuscous grey, paler towards base; the fringe rufous tinged.

Adults are found from June to September depending on the location. There is one generation per year.

The larvae feed on the stems and roots of various grasses and low plants, including Petasites hybridus.

Similar species
Requiring genitalic examination to separate. See Townsend et al.
 Amphipoea fucosa
 Amphipoea crinanensis
 Amphipoea lucens

References

External links

 Taxonomy
Lepidoptera of Belgium
De Vlinderstichting 
Lepiforum e.V. Includes photo of genitalia

Acronictinae
Moths described in 1761
Palearctic Lepidoptera
Taxa named by Carl Linnaeus